Sir George Osborne was acquired in 1814 by British owners purchasing a prize. They initially sailed her as a West Indiaman. Then in 1820 she carried immigrants to South Africa under the auspices of a settler scheme. She then made one voyage as a whaler in the British southern whale fishery. Under new owners she then made a highly unusual voyage to the Pacific. Her new owners were the founders of the Pacific Pearl Fishery Company (est. 1825), and they sailed her on a voyage that was part commercial venture and part scientific exploration, complete with a resident scientist. After her return new owners sent her whaling to the Seychelles, where she was wrecked and abandoned in April 1829.

Career
Sir George Osborne entered Lloyd's Register (LR) in the 1815 volume (published in 1814), with W. Hewett, master, Broderick & Co. owner, and trade Plymouth–Bristol, changing to Bristol–Dominica. The trade data are consistent with Sir George Osborne being a prize brought into Plymouth and being condemned and sold there with her new owners then sailing her to Bristol. 

An advertisement in October 1814 by Robert Noyes describes her as new, and stated that she would be sailing to Madeira, Barbados, Martinique, and Dominica, with William Hewitt, commander. In September 1815 Edward Jones & Sons, and Redcliff Back, offered her for sale. In 1816 Captain Hewitt was her master and owner and under his command she made a voyage to Trinidad.

Immigrants to South Africa
Sir George Osborne was one of the many vessels that brought immigrants to South Africa from England under the 1820 Settlers scheme. The "Sir George Osborne Transport" sailed from Gravesend and left the Downs on 16 March 1820, bound for the Cape of Good Hope. Edward Turvey led a group of 61 immigrants, Daniel Mills led a group of 29 immigrants, and Edward Gardner led a group of 29 immigrants. She arrived at Simon's Bay on 19 June. She sailed on to Algoa Bay, Port Elizabeth and arrived there in July. Sir George Osborne, Telfar, master, arrived back at Portsmouth on 2 February 1821.

Whaling voyage
Captain John Stavers sailed from England on 24 April 1821 on a whaling voyage. He returned on 22 July 1823 with 500 casks of whale oil and one cask of ambergris.

On her return, Sir George Osbornes owners offered her for sale.

Lloyd's Register reported that Sir George Osborne had damages repaired in 1824. It also showed her master changing from Stavers to Coulson. In the 1825 volume her owner was Moultrie and her trade was London–Cape of Good Hope. Captain Coulson sailed from Gravesend for the Cape on 11 September 1824, and arrived there on 29 November. Sir George Osborne sailed for London on 6 February 1825, and arrived at Gravesend on 17 April.

Voyage of exploration
Joseph Thompson, who had engaged in whaling, seal hunting, and pearl fishing in the Pacific, and Thomas Icely, the majority shareholder in a vessel of which Thompson was master, created the Pacific Pearl Fishery Company. They floated the company in April 1825. 

The Pacific Pearl Fishery Company purchased Sir George Osborne, with Thompson as master, and chartered or purchased a second vessel, Rolla, with Nielson (or Nelson) as master. LR for 1826 showed Sir George Osborne with Thompson, master, South Pacific Company as owner, and trade London–Peru.   The venture was part commercial enterprise and part scientific exploration in that the partners engaged the naturalist Samuel Stutchbury to document the expedition.

Sir George Osborne, Thompson, master, and Rolla, Nelson, master, sailed for New South Wales on 15 August 1825. Sir George Osborne was also carrying Jane and William Williams who were sailing to New Zealand to serve there as missionaries. Her cargo included 300 stud merino sheep for New South Wales.

The Sydney Gazette and New South Wales Advertiser reported on Sir George Osbornes arrival, and published the prospectus for the Pacific Pearl Fishing Company. The newspaper noted that apparently many of the initial investors had immediately sold their shares.

Sir George Osborne sailed from Sydney on 18 March 1826 and landed at Paihia, Bay of Islands, on 26 March. From there she sailed to gather pearls in the Tuamoto Archipelago, particularly in the Hao Atoll.

On 19 January 1827 Sir George Osborne passed between two portions of Neilson Reef.

A report dated "Sydney, 7 March" stated that the voyage of Sir George Osborne and Rolla had met with considerable success. Sir George Osborne had been despatched to England with a full cargo. The principal part consisted of shells, arrow-root,cocoa nut, oil, etc., which had been procured in the Society Islands.

Sir George Osborne arrived at Dartmouth in May 1827. She brought the first news to London of the death of Pōmare III, the King of Otaheite. The young king had died of dysentery, leaving no male heir. On 25 June 1827 there appeared in the Public Ledger and Daily Advertiser and advertisement for 40 tons of "Cocoa Nut oil" that Sir George Osborne had brought from Otaheite. Stutchbury published a catalogue of the scientific samples that he had collected.

Once again Sir George Osborne was offered for sale. 

{{quote|...312 tons per register...adapted particularly for a South Seaman or Passenger Ship. Now lying in the West India Import Dock.<ref>Public Ledger and Daily Advertiser (10 October 1827).</ref>}}

WhalerSir George Osborne was reported to have been at the Seychelles with 30 barrels of whale oil in September 1828.

Fate
On 24 April 1829, Sir George Osborne'', House, master, ran aground in the Seychelles. She broke up after her crew had abandoned her. Her cargo of 1000 barrels of whale oil was retrieved and transshipped.

Notes

Citations

References
 
  
 
 
 
 
 
 

1810 ships
Ships built in France
Captured ships
Age of Sail merchant ships of England
Migrant ships
Whaling ships
Exploration ships
Maritime incidents in April 1829